Guss T'Mar Scott (born May 21, 1982) is an American former college and professional football player was a safety in the National Football League (NFL) for two seasons during the early 2000s.  Scott played college football for the University of Florida, and thereafter, he played professionally for the New England Patriots and Houston Texans of the NFL.

Early years 

Scott was born in Jacksonville, Florida in 1982.  He attended Trinity Christian Academy in Jacksonville, and played for the TCA high school football team.  He played on offense as a running back and defense as a defensive back, and was a three-year starter.  As a senior in 1999, he was recognized as a Florida Class 2A second-team selection at running back while rushing for 1,920 yards and compiling five interceptions.

College career 

Scott accepted an athletic scholarship to attend the University of Florida in Gainesville, Florida, where he played strong safety for coach Steve Spurrier and coach Ron Zook's Florida Gators football teams from 2000 to 2003.  He saw action on special teams as a true freshman and sophomore, and was a regular starter at safety during his junior and senior seasons.  He was recognized as the Gators' defensive back of the year in 2002, and led the Southeastern Conference (SEC) in forced fumbles in 2003.

Professional career 

Scott spent parts of the 2006 NFL season on the rosters of the Houston Texans, Miami Dolphins and New York Jets. He finished his NFL career on the practice squad of the Seattle Seahawks. In three NFL regular seasons, Scott played in eleven regular season games and started two of them.

See also 

 List of Florida Gators in the NFL Draft
 List of New England Patriots players

References

Bibliography 

 Carlson, Norm, University of Florida Football Vault: The History of the Florida Gators, Whitman Publishing, LLC, Atlanta, Georgia (2007).  .
 Golenbock, Peter, Go Gators!  An Oral History of Florida's Pursuit of Gridiron Glory, Legends Publishing, LLC, St. Petersburg, Florida (2002).  .
 Hairston, Jack, Tales from the Gator Swamp: A Collection of the Greatest Gator Stories Ever Told, Sports Publishing, LLC, Champaign, Illinois (2002).  .

1982 births
Living people
American football safeties
Florida Gators football players
Houston Texans players
Miami Dolphins players
New England Patriots players
New York Jets players
Players of American football from Jacksonville, Florida
Seattle Seahawks players